Roger Freeman may refer to:

 Roger Freeman, Baron Freeman (born 1942), British Conservative politician
 Roger Freeman (co-driver) (1951–2003), British rally car driver
 Roger A. Freeman (1928–2005), British military historian
 Roger Freeman (politician) (1965–2014), an American politician
 Matt Freeman (born 1966), American bass guitarist and singer, birth name Roger Matthew Freeman
Roger Freeman, member of the 1980s band Pigbag